Lock-on after launch (LOAL) is an ability of missile systems to lock-on to a target after being launched from a carrier vehicle. The term is normally used in reference to airborne weapons, especially air-to-air missiles. LOAL is an important part of modern weapon systems as it allows a weapon to be carried internally to increase stealth and then acquire a target once it has left a launching aircraft. LOAL systems normally rely on cuing from a helmet mounted sight or onboard sensors like radar or forward-looking infrared (FLIR), and use a simple strapdown inertial guidance system to know where to look after launch. Examples of LOAL weapons include the Advanced Short Range Air-to-Air Missile (ASRAAM) and later versions of the AGM-114 Hellfire anti-tank missile. The older method of launch has retroactively become known as lock-on before launch (LOBL), although this term is not commonly used and is a backronym to distinguish it from the LOAL method.

References
 

Aerial warfare strategy
Air-to-air missiles
Air-to-surface missiles
Military radars